Simon Gaudenti (4 November 1629 – September, 1719) was a Roman Catholic prelate who served as Bishop of Ossero (1673–1719).

Biography
Simon Gaudenti was born in Spalaten on 4 November 1629 and ordained a priest on 19 September 1654. On 30 January 1673, he was appointed during the papacy of Pope Clement X as Bishop of Ossero. On 12 March 1673, he was consecrated bishop by Gasparo Carpegna, Cardinal-Priest of San Silvestro in Capite, with Alessandro Crescenzi (cardinal), Titular Patriarch of Alexandria, and Hyacinthe Libelli, Archbishop of Avignon, serving as co-consecrators. He served as Bishop of Ossero until his death in September 1719.

References 

17th-century Roman Catholic bishops in Croatia
18th-century Roman Catholic bishops in Croatia
Bishops appointed by Pope Clement X
1673 births
1719 deaths
Croatian bishops
18th-century Roman Catholic bishops in the Holy Roman Empire